Andrianovsky is a rural locality (a khutor) in Krasnoarmeyskoye Rural Settlement, Novonikolayevsky District, Volgograd Oblast, Russia. The population was 64 as of 2010. There are 2 streets.

Geography 
Andrianovsky is located in steppe, on the Khopyorsko-Buzulukskaya Plain, on the left bank of the Kupava River, 67 km northeast of Novonikolayevsky (the district's administrative centre) by road. Novoberezovsky is the nearest rural locality.

References 

Rural localities in Novonikolayevsky District